Michel Daviault (born 25 November 1952 in Montreal, Quebec) was a member of the House of Commons of Canada from 1993 to 1997. His career has been in real estate and administration.

He was elected in the Ahuntsic electoral district under the Bloc Québécois party in the 1993 federal election, thus serving in the 35th Canadian Parliament. He did not seek a second term in office and therefore left Canadian politics following the 1997 federal election.

References
 

1952 births
Bloc Québécois MPs
Living people
Members of the House of Commons of Canada from Quebec
Politicians from Montreal